Hero, formerly known as Her Story, is a 2022 Chinese drama film directed by Sylvia Chang, Li Shaohong and Joan Chen, and starring Zhou Xun and Sammi Cheng. Other cast consists of Jackson Yee, Stephen Fung, Huang Miyi, and Nina Paw. The film follows the story of three ordinary women's love lives, careers and families during the  COVID-19 pandemic. Hero was theatrically released on 9 September 2022 in China.

Cast
Zhou Xun as Shen Yue
Sammi Cheng as Liang Jingsi
Jackson Yee as Li Zhaohua
 as Li Ju
Stephen Fung as He Daren

Huang Miyi as Zhou Xiaolu
Nina Paw
Batu
Zhu Yafen

Ma Xinmo

Soundtrack

Release
Hero premiered in China on 9 September 2022.

Reception
Douban, a major Chinese media rating site, the film has scored 5.5 out of 10.

References

External links
 
 

2022 drama films
2020s Mandarin-language films
Chinese drama films
Films shot in Beijing
Films set in Beijing
Films shot in Hubei
Films set in Hubei
Films shot in Hong Kong
Films set in Hong Kong